The 1962–63 season was Real Madrid Club de Fútbol's 60th season in existence and the club's 31st consecutive season in the top flight of Spanish football.

Summary
Owing to a disappointing performance of Spain in the 1962 FIFA World Cup, the Spanish Federation imposed a ban on the transfers of foreign players, with the measure lasting 11 years until 1973 with oriundo players exemptions. During the summer midfielder Luis Del Sol was sold to Juventus. The club transferred in defender Ignacio Zoco from Osasuna an arrival to reinforce the back-up line. The transitional stage in the club continued with new arrivals such as right winger Amancio Amaro Nicknamed 'The Wizard' from Deportivo La Coruña French midfielder Lucien Muller (Di Stefano saw him during a Spain-France match and asked him to play in Real Madrid) slovak Yanko Daucik and FC Barcelona Brazilian forward Evaristo de Macedo.

The club repeated defended its La Liga title from the previous season, its ninth overall, also marking Real Madrid's first ever three-peat. The team finished 12 points above runners-up Atlético Madrid. In the Copa del Generalísimo, the squad reached the semi-finals where it was defeated by Zaragoza. In the European Cup, Madrid was eliminated in the preliminary round, surprisingly losing to Belgian squad RSC Anderlecht. Additionally, 36-years-old forward Ferenc Puskás again won the individual League top-scorer trophy with 26 goals.

Players

Transfers

Competitions

La Liga

League table

Position by round

Matches

Copa del Generalísimo

Round of 32

Eightfinals

Quarter-finals

Semi-finals

European Cup

Preliminary round

Statistics

Squad statistics

Players statistics

References

 BDFútbol

Real Madrid CF seasons
Spanish football championship-winning seasons
Real Madrid